Sodovik Stadium is a multi-use stadium in Sterlitamak, Russia.  It is currently used mostly for football matches and was the home ground of the former football team FC Sodovik Sterlitamak.  The stadium holds 5,180 people and was opened in 2000.

References

Football venues in Russia
Buildings and structures in Bashkortostan
FC Sodovik Sterlitamak